is a Japanese manga artist. He attended Osaka University of Arts, majoring in design in the college of fine arts. In February 1981, Yano made his debut with Kyōka Senshi Armpit, which won the 2nd Seinen Manga Contest.

Works
Akirecha Dame Desu
ArbeZ
Bust Shot
Celluloid Night
Chotto Kakushita
Cottonplay
Dreamer
Free Radical
From-C
Hinako Variation
Homage
Hunter Killer Mina
Injukāshisu
Jashin Densetsu series
Confusion
Dark Mermaid
Lamia
Last Creator
Re-Birth
Love Simulation
Masami no Kimochi
Mo Ichido Once More 
Neko Janai mon!
Network Warrior
Onigarijū
P·U·L·S·E
Prefab Rhapsody
Program Alice
SD Gundam Sangokuden Eiyuu Gekitotsu Hen
Sweet Time

External links
  
 Kentaro Yano at Media Arts Database 
 

1957 births
Living people
Manga artists from Tokyo
People from Tokyo
Osaka University of Arts alumni